

Changes for the 2007–08 season
 Querétaro were relegated from Liga MX
 Puebla were promoted to Liga MX

Added Teams
Coatzacoalcos
Real Colima
Tapatio
Salamanca
Tapachula
Socio Aguila (Clausura 2007)

Dropped Teams
La Piedad
Veracruz B (Apertura 2006)
 Guerreros
 U de G
 Tabasco (Apertura 2006)
Zacatepec (Apertura 2006)
Celaya (Clausura 2007)
Orizaba (Clausura 2007)

Stadium and locations

Torneo Apertura 2007

Tournament Format

Promotion

One team is promoted to the Primera División each year (two short tournaments). After the Clausura 2008 tournament, the champions of the Apertura 2007 and Clausura 2008 tournaments will play a home and home series to determine which team will be promoted. If the same team wins both tournaments it will be promoted automatically. In order for a team to be promoted it has to obtain a certification from the Federación Mexicana de Fútbol Asociación. If the winner of the promotional final is not certified for promotion a home and home series is played between the highest placed certified team and the club being relegated to the Primera División A to determine which will be in the Primera División.

Relegation

One team is relegated to the Segunda División each year (two short tournaments). The team that has the worst points to games played ratio over the previous three years (Apertura 2005, Clausura 2006, Apertura 2006, Clausura 2007, Apertura 2007, Clausura 2008) is relegated to the Segunda División.

General league table

Liguilla

Quarter-finals

First leg

Second leg

Semi-finals

First leg

Second leg

Final

First leg

Second leg

Torneo Clausura 2008

Primera División A (Méxican First A Division) Clausura 2008 is a Méxican football tournament – one of two  tournaments held in one year. It began Friday, January 11, 2008. Reigning champions Indios could not defend their title, as León won their 3rd title in Primera División A, and earned the right to battle Indios in a two-leg aggregate to try to earn promotion to the Primera División de México.

Group league tables

Group 1

Group 2

General league table

Liguilla

Quarter-finals

First leg

Second leg

Semi-finals

First leg

Second leg

Final

First leg

Second leg

Promotional final

First Leg

Second leg

Top scorers

Last updated: May 3, 2008Source: FMF

References

External links
Federación Mexicana de Fútbol Asociación, A. C.

Ascenso MX seasons
Mex
2007–08 in Mexican football
2009 domestic association football leagues
Mex

es:Primera División 'A' de México